Port Shepstone High School is a public co-educational high school in Port Shepstone in KwaZulu-Natal, South Africa.It is one of top schools in the lower South Coast. The school  has a strong reputation in producing a high matric pass rate.

History
The school officially opened on 13 February 1953 when the old Port Shepstone School (founded in 1883) grew too big and had to split into the Port Shepstone Primary School and High School.

The school today
It is run by the KwaZulu-Natal Department of Education and a governing body.

Notable alumni 
 Warren Britz, Springbok player
 Khalipha Cele, South African first-class cricketer.
 Fundi Zwane

References

External links
Port Shepstone High School site

Schools in KwaZulu-Natal
Educational institutions established in 1953
1953 establishments in South Africa
High schools in South Africa